Adrara San Martino is a comune in the province of Bergamo, in Lombardy, northern Italy.

Main sights

The main attraction is the parish church of San Martino (15th century, restored later), in white stone. It houses paintings by Giovanni Carnovali, Francesco Coghetti and Giacomo Trecourt. The bell tower, with ogival windows, is also from the 15th century.

Other sights include the sanctuary of Santa Maria Annunciata (17th century), the Romanesque religious complex of Sant'Alessandro (11th century), with fragments of 14th-century frescoes, and ruins of the medieval castle.

Coat of arms
The coat of arms shows a brick tower on a blue diagonal cross, on a white background.

See also

Adrara San Rocco, next to Adrara San Martino

References

External links
Official website

Cities and towns in Lombardy
Castles in Italy